Nathan Rivers (born August 31, 1955) is a former American football running back. He played for the New York Giants in 1980.

References

1955 births
Living people
People from Charleston County, South Carolina
Players of American football from South Carolina
American football running backs
South Carolina State Bulldogs football players
New York Giants players